Jiří Schubert (born 18 April 1988) is a professional Czech football player.

References
 
 

1988 births
Living people
Sportspeople from Mladá Boleslav
Czech footballers
Czech First League players
FK Mladá Boleslav players
FK Varnsdorf players

Association football forwards